Eurocentres - Global Language Learning has 20 language schools in 13 countries for people to learn English and French, in a destination where the language concerned is spoken. Eurocentres provide language and 21st-century skills to international students. It has made significant contributions to the field of language teaching and remains as internationally recognized organization, dedicated to maintaining global dialogues across cultures.

History
The first Eurocentres language school was founded in 1948 by a Swiss, Erhard Waespi, in Bournemouth and is probably the oldest language school still operating on England's south coast. Waespi's vision was that learning a language should be an enjoyable, enriching and personal experience that increased understanding between cultures. In 1960 he handed over his five schools for English (Bournemouth, London) French, (Lausanne) German (Cologne – now Berlin) and Italian (Florence) to the Eurocentres Foundation, which he then managed for another 20 years. In 1970, Eurocentres acquired Davies's Schools of English at Cambridge. After 2000 Eurocentres began to expand outside of Europe.

The Eurocentres Global Language Learning has been a consultant to the Council of Europe for the development of the Common European Framework of Reference for language teaching and learning. 

For 72 years, Eurocentres was a Foundation Institution owned by Migros Cultural Percentage,[1]. The aims foundation implied to promote understanding between people and bridge national, cultural and social barriers. 

In 2018 Eurocentres is part of the German firm mvc Education & Career group.

In 2020 Eurocentres was acquired by Bayswater Education.

Pioneer Period: 1948 - 1960 
1948: Erhard Waespi opens the first Eurocentres school in Bournemouth.

1959: The early Eurocentres schools come to the attention of the Federation of Migros Cooperatives. Founder Gottlieb Duttweiler takes over and opens three new centres in Florence, Barcelona, and Cologne.
1960: Duttweiler forms an independent Foundation under the Eurocentres name, creating a number of what he terms 'European Language and Educational Centres'. The total number of students studying with the Foundation rises to 4,300.

Initial Expansion Period: 1960 - 1975 
1960: Collaboration with France, Spain, and the USA begins.

1968: Eurocentres receives the "Statut Consultatif de la Catégorie 1" - advisory status in the field of language teaching and learning - from the Council of Europe.

1975: The number of students exceeds 20,000 per year.

Implementation Period: 1975 – 1985 
1975: The first purpose-built school in London showcases innovative classroom design and self-learning facilities, as well as facilities for Computer Assisted Language Learning.

1977: The first purpose-built school in London showcases innovative classroom design and self-learning facilities, as well as facilities for Computer Assisted Language Learning.

1984: Eurocentres Cambridge, the second model school for teaching adults, follows.

Second Expansion Period: 1986 – 1999 
1986: The first purpose-built school for teaching German opens in Cologne.

1988: New center's are opened in countries outside of Europe, including the United States and Japan.

1990: Eurocentres aids in the development of the CEFR (Common European Framework of Reference for Languages) and is commended by the Council of Europe Language Policy Unit for its contributions.

1991: With the completion of a new purpose-built school in La Rochelle, there are now 3 year-round schools in France – Paris, Amboise, and La Rochelle.

1993: The "Eurocentres Scale of Language Proficiency" is put into practice. It is followed by the development of a computerised language testing system which enables teachers to generate reliable tests according to students' individual needs.

1995: The first consultancy agreements take shape in Switzerland, Spain, and Brazil.

1999: International collaboration leads to partnerships in Canada and Malta.

Third Expansion Period: 2001 – 2018 
2002: There are now two Eurocentres schools in Canada, and further partnerships develop with schools in Malta, Australia and Spain.

2005: There are now two Eurocentres schools across Australia and a centre opens in Auckland, New Zealand.

2006: Cape Town, South Africa, opens its own center.

2007: A new school for teaching German opens in Berlin.

2008: The Eurocentres school network in Australia is completed with the opening of Eurocentres Sydney. Today: Eurocentres remains an internationally recognised organisation, with a network of schools, agencies and offices dedicated to maintaining global dialogues across cultures.

2018: All Eurocentres’ English and French activities, including schools in the UK, France, a franchise network, and teaching provisions across the world have been acquired by German firm mvc Education & Career group. CEO and owner Stefan Menden sees Eurocentres as a “synergy” with the company’s current portfolio. “Our experience lies in professional development/career services which combine very well with Eurocentres’ strategy to teach 21st-century skills,” he said.

Schools
Eurocentres offers languages schools in the UK and Ireland (London Victoria, Bournemouth, Brighton, Cambridge, Dublin and Galway); Australia (Cairns) ; Canada (Toronto, Lunenburg and Vancouver); United States (San Diego); France (Paris and La Rochelle),  South Africa (Cape Town); Malta (Pembroke);

Previous Schools: (Perth, Sydney, Brisbane Melbourne); New Zealand (Auckland)); United States (Alexandria, Virginia, New York and East Lansing); Malta (Sliema); France (Amboise); Switzerland (Lausanne); Spain (Barcelona, Valencia and Marbella); Germany (Berlin); Italy (Florence); Japan ( Kanazawa); China (Beijing);Turkey(İstanbul) and Russia (Moscow, St Petersburg); .

Courses
Eurocentres offers a variety of language courses from general language, exam preparation (IELTS, Cambridge FCE, Cambridge CAE, Cambridge CPE, TOEFL, DELF, DALF) to Business and Language, work and study programs, Culture courses.

In Turkey they offer IELTS Course as well

References

External links
 Eurocentres Language Schools Worldwide 
Eurocentres - Brazil/Portugal
Eurocentres - Italy
Eurocentres - Spain
Eurocentres - Turkey
Language schools